Patriarch Cyril VI may refer to:

 Cyril VI Tanas, Patriarch of Antioch in 1724–1760
 Cyril VI of Constantinople, Ecumenical Patriarch of Constantinople in 1813–1818
 Pope Cyril VI of Alexandria, Pope of Alexandria & Patriarch of the See of St. Mark in 1959–1971